The Avery County Jail, also known as Avery County Historical Museum, is a historic jail located at Newland, Avery County, North Carolina. It was built in 1913.  It was designed by architects Wheeler & Runge in Italianate style. It is a two-story, stuccoed brick building with small one-story wings and a cross-hipped roof.  A one-story wing was added in the 1960s.

It was listed on the National Register of Historic Places in 1999.

References

External links
Avery County Historical Museum website

Jails on the National Register of Historic Places in North Carolina
Italianate architecture in North Carolina
Government buildings completed in 1913
Buildings and structures in Avery County, North Carolina
Jails in North Carolina
National Register of Historic Places in Avery County, North Carolina
Museums in Avery County, North Carolina
1913 establishments in North Carolina